Rockburn is a surname. Notable people with the surname include:

Harvey Rockburn (1904–1977), Canadian ice hockey player
Ken Rockburn (born 1947), Canadian radio and television journalist and host